Pizza is a 2012 Tamil-language supernatural mystery thriller film written and directed by debutant Karthik Subbaraj. The film stars Vijay Sethupathi in lead role with Remya Nambeesan, Aadukalam Naren, Jayakumar, Pooja Ramachandran and Bobby Simha play supporting roles. It is the first installment in the Pizza film series.

The story is about a pizza delivery man named Michael who lands in a mysterious predicament, and how it affects his life. The film, produced by C. V. Kumar under Thirukumaran Entertainment, was released by Sangam Cinemas. Featuring music composed by Santhosh Narayanan and cinematography by Gopi Amarnath, it was the first Tamil film to feature 7.1 surround sound. Pizza released on 19 October 2012 to highly positive reviews for its direction, storyline, screenplay, performances, background score, and plot twist. It become a major critical and commercial success grossing  crores.

Pizza was later remade into Kannada as Whistle (2013) and in Hindi as Pizza (2014). It was also remade into the  Bengali film Golpo Holeo Shotti (2014).

Plot

Michael Karthikeyan is a pizza delivery boy who lives with his girlfriend, Anu, an aspiring novelist researching material for a horror story. Michael does not believe in the supernatural but is afraid of anything paranormal. Anu keeps telling him that he will soon realise the presence of supernatural beings. At first, Michael is confused and scared, and his fears are confirmed when he discovers that a spirit possesses his boss, the Pizzeria owner Shanmugam's daughter.

Meanwhile, Anu becomes pregnant, and after a brief altercation, Michael and Anu get covertly married. One particular day, Michael goes out to deliver a pizza to a customer and returns to the restaurant in shock while covered in blood; he keeps muttering Anu's name, seemingly worried about her. When his boss questions him, Michael explains that he had been to deliver a pizza to a customer named Smitha in a bungalow and recounts the events at the place.

Smitha requests Michael to wait downstairs while she goes upstairs to get money for the pizza. Almost immediately, the power goes out, alarming Michael. While waiting downstairs, Michael hears a loud unidentifiable noise from the bedroom upstairs. Going up to investigate, he finds Smitha murdered suspiciously and notices a slice of pizza he had delivered is missing, suggesting that there may be somebody else in the house. Horrified, Michael dashes to the door only to realize it is locked from the outside.

Furthermore, when the murdered woman's husband Bobby arrives, he at first believes he stumbles upon his wife having an affair. Through his cellphone, Michael communicates with Bobby and explains his situation thoroughly, instigating Bobby to aid him in getting out of the house. Moreover, Bobby suddenly disappears from the front entrance and is found by Michael inside the house, mysteriously murdered in the same room as his wife, with two slices of pizza now missing. Also, Michael encounters the couple's child "Nithya", identical to the spirit's name allegedly possessing Shanmugam's daughter.

Michael tries everything to get out of the house, including breaking down the sealed doors leading outside and using the house phone, which works even though the line is dead. He manages to contact Anu using the phone and gets her to contact the local police. When a couple of officers arrive at the bungalow, Michael believes that Anu had requested them to help him, but they reveal that four people died in that house- Smitha, Bobby, their young daughter, and a girl named Anu, implying that she is Michael's girlfriend, Anu. The police disclose that Michael is a suspect and attempt to arrest him. Confused, Michael does not believe them and attempts to escape to search for Anu.

Michael then witnesses the police getting dragged into the house and killed. At this juncture, Michael, in a horrified state, runs back to the restaurant. While Michael is unconvinced that Anu is dead, his friends at the restaurant and Shanmugam start realising they had never seen Anu; they also observe that Michael's home does not have any evidence that he lived with Anu. Also, the haunted bungalow witnessed the untimely deaths of a married couple, their daughter, and two police officers whose ghosts Michael interacted with earlier. Meanwhile, Michael seems to continue his search for Anu, has constant health issues, and seems to be disturbed by supernatural entities.

As Michael stops and calls Anu during a delivery, the true story of what had happened is disclosed. The Income Tax department had planned a raid on Shanmugam's house. Shanmugam, who has diamonds worth around 20 million hidden in his restaurant, hides them in a candy box and asks Michael to deliver them to his house. But Michael has a bike accident and comes in contact with the hidden diamonds. Michael and Anu decide that stealing those diamonds would improve their lives and support their baby. So, they concoct a clever story in which Michael convincingly "forgets" the Pizza bag at the "haunted" bungalow, which Shanmugam would never enter into, given his fear of the supernatural. Meanwhile, Anu has left for Kochi via Bangalore with the diamonds and her belongings and obtained fake documentation using which Michael and Anu can settle abroad.

After the phone call, Michael goes to deliver a pizza to a house and encounters a series of events similar to the story he had narrated. Inside, he meets a girl identical to the "Nithya" described in his tale. Michael is locked inside the home with "Nithya" curiously looking at him. The lights then go out.

Cast
Vijay Sethupathi as Michael Karthikeyan
Remya Nambeesan as Anu, Michael's love interest
Aadukalam Naren as Shanmugham
Karunakaran as Raghavan
Bobby Simha as Bobby
Pooja Ramachandran as Smitha
Veera Santhanam as an Exorcist
Gajaraj as a police officer
Nalan Kumarasamy as Michael's friend (uncredited role)
Kavin in an uncredited role

Soundtrack

The soundtrack album and background score was composed by Santhosh Narayanan. The lyrics for the songs were written by Kabilan, Arunraja Kamaraj, Muthamil and Vineeth.

Pizza is Santhosh's second album after Attakathi. The audio rights for the soundtrack album were purchased by Think Music. The soundtrack album for the film was launched on 6 September 2012, at Sathyam Cinemas, Chennai. Along with the film's cast and crew, celebrities such as director Dharani, Prabhu Solomon, Seenu Ramasamy, Balaji Mohan, S. R. Prabhakaran, Pa. Ranjith, actor Vaibhav Reddy, lyricist Madhan Karky and singers Haricharan, Gana Bala graced the event.

The album received mixed review from Behindwoods, stating that "The album stands out for its experimentation with the songs being targeted totally at the youth. The couple of instrumental pieces add more embellishment" giving a rating of 2.5 out of 5.

Release
Pizza was released on 19 October 2012 by Sangam Cinemas Chennai, in 300 theatres initially and the number of theatres was increased to 600 after the film's positive response. Pizza was made on a budget  1.5 crores. The satellite rights of the film were secured by Sun TV.

Bejoy Nambiar bought the Hindi remake rights of Pizza and he will produce under his banner Getaway Films. Prashant Raj of Love Guru fame bought the Kannada remake rights of the film. Following the film's success, sources reported that it may be remade in Hollywood as well. Renowned Bengali Director Birsa Dasgupta was also remaking the film as Golpo Holeo Shotti.

Critical reception
Pizza received widespread acclaim from critics. N. Venkateswaran from The Times of India gave 4 out of 5 stars and wrote that director Karthik Subburaj displayed a "strong control of the medium and gives abundant display of his narrative skills", going to add: "If he maintains the quality of his menu and future offerings, Karthik [...] is sure to become one of Kollywood's top directors". Sify termed the film as "delicious" and described it as "entertaining and at the same time different in its approach". Malini Mannath from The New Indian Express described Pizza as "offbeat, intriguing and gripping, and nothing like what you've seen on Tamil screen before". A reviewer from Behindwoods.com stated, Karthik Subburaj played "all the cards required to make a quality horror suspense film with a thrilling screenplay, deft camerawork, strong performances, eerie sound effects and music". Indiaglitz.com wrote: "If the success of a thriller lies in bringing the film-goer to the edge of the seat, Pizza does it. With right toppings in the form of a taut screenplay, deft camera work, eerie sound effects and nice background score, the movie manages to leave a mark". Vivek Ramz of in.com rated it 3.5/5 and cited that Pizza was a "well made suspense thriller that keeps you guessing for most parts". Top10Cinema.com wrote that the story had been told "very interestingly" and that "horror movie buffs will certainly enjoy this Pizza".

Some mixed reviews were given by Malathi Rangarajan from The Hindu and Haricharan Pudipeddi from Nowrunning.com, who both criticized the first half of the film. The former claimed that the second half of Pizza has a "reasonably enjoyable tanginess, but to get to that you have to sit through the protraction of the first" and that "the screenplay [...] doesn't render much help", while the latter concluded that the film displayed "signs of a craftily executed thriller, but falls short of satisfaction due to erratic narration", giving it 2.5 out of 5 stars.

Sequel
A sequel called Pizza 2: The Villa was produced and released the following year by the same production house. The sequel did not carry on with the characters from Pizza, and told another eerie tale, with Ashok Selvan and Sanchita Shetty playing the lead roles.

Awards
2nd South Indian International Movie Awards
Best Actor Critics - Vijay Sethupathi
Best Debutant Director - Karthik Subbaraj
Nominated—Best Film
Nominated—Best Cinematographer - Gopi Amarnath

Vikatan Awards
Vikatan Award For Best Screenplay - Karthik Subbaraj
Vikatan Award For Best Cinematography - Gopi Amarnath
Vikatan Award For Best Editing - Leo John Paul

7th Vijay Awards
Best Story, Screenplay Writer - Karthik Subbaraj
Best Crew
Best Cinematographer - Gopi Amarnath

Legacy
The success of Pizza turned Vijay Sethupathi into one of the most sought-after actors in Tamil cinema. Along with Pizza, Sethupathi scored back-to-back successes with Sundarapandian (which featured him in negative role) and Naduvula Konjam Pakkatha Kaanom in the same year resulting in a rise in his popularity.
 Film critic Baradwaj Rangan stated that Sethupathi had become "[...] sort of [an] indie-film star, the first ever in Tamil cinema". The film also established C. V. Kumar as a producer who went on to produce films with innovative themes throughout his career. Pizza and Kadhalil Sodhappuvadhu Eppadi became trendsetters and established the trend of short filmmakers making their cinematic debut.

References

External links

See also
 Pizza (film series)

2012 films
Indian horror thriller films
2012 horror thriller films
2010s mystery thriller films
Indian mystery thriller films
2010s Tamil-language films
Films scored by Santhosh Narayanan
Tamil films remade in other languages
2012 directorial debut films
Films directed by Karthik Subbaraj